Mall Molesworth and Emily Hood Westacott claimed their second domestic title by defeating Joan Hartigan and Midge Van Ryn 6–3, 6–3 in the final, to win the women's doubles tennis title at the 1933 Australian Championships.

Seeds

  Coral Buttsworth /  Marjorie Crawford (quarterfinals)
  Meryl O'Hara Wood /  Gladys Toyne (quarterfinals)
  Mall Molesworth /  Emily Hood Westacott (champions)
 ( Dorothy Bellamy /  Molly Muirhead) (quarterfinals)
  Joan Hartigan /  Midge Van Ryn (final)
  Nell Hall /  Frances Hoddle-Wrigley (quarterfinals)

Draw

Finals

Earlier rounds

Section 1

Section 2

Notes

References

External links
 Source for seedings

1933 in Australian tennis
1933 in women's tennis
1933 in Australian women's sport
Women's Doubles